The British Iron and Steel Federation (BISF), formed in 1934, was an organisation of British iron and steel producers responsible for the national planning of steel production.  Its creation was imposed on the industry by Ramsay MacDonald's National Government as a precondition to the establishment of steel import tariffs.  It was a successor to the National Federation of Iron and Steel Manufacturers, formed in 1918.

Sir William James Larke was the first director of the federation.

It continued to exist until 1967 when the industry was nationalised as British Steel Corporation during Harold Wilson's second term in government.

See also
 BISF house

References

External links
A History of UK Steel Industry Associations
Catalogue of the BISF archives, held at the Modern Records Centre, University of Warwick
Catalogue of the BISF Dissolution Committee archives, held at the Modern Records Centre, University of Warwick

Business organisations based in the United Kingdom
1934 establishments in the United Kingdom
Organizations established in 1934
Steel industry of the United Kingdom